Major General Kahinda Otafiire is a Ugandan politician and retired military officer. He is the current Minister of Internal Affairs in the Cabinet of Uganda, since 8 June 2021.

He previously served as the Justice & Constitutional Affairs in the Ugandan Cabinet. He was appointed to that position of 27 May 2011. Otafiire is also the elected Member of Parliament (MP) for Ruhinda County, Mitooma District in the Ugandan Parliament.

Background and education
He was born in Mitooma District on 29 December 1950. He attended Kitabi Seminary, Kahinda Otafiire holds the degree of Bachelor of Arts in Social Science. He also holds a certificate in the French Language.

Career
Kahinda Otafiire first worked as a Youth Officer from 1975 until 1976. He then worked  as a Foreign Service Officer in the Ministry of Foreign Affairs from 1976 until 1980. In 1981, he joined Yoweri Museveni in the National Resistance Army (NRA) guerrilla organisation, where he served as the Chief Political Commissar from 1981 until 1984. Between 1984 and 1986, the title of his job was called National Political Commissar, also in the NRA. Just prior to the NRA capturing power from the military junta in Kampala in 1986, he served as Commissioner, Internal Affairs Interim Administration, in the areas under NRA administration from 1985 until 1986.

Between 1986 and 1988, he served as Minister of State for Internal Affairs. He had to resign this position because he brandished a pistol at a woman in a Kampala bar. From 1988 until 1992, he served as the Presidential Assistant for Security. He then served as the Director General of the External Security Organization (ESO) from 1992 until 1994.

From 1994 until 1995, he served as a delegate to the Constituent Assembly which drafted the 1995 Uganda Constitution. He then served as Minister of State for Security from 1994 until 1995. From 1996 until 2001, Kahinda Otafiire served as Minister of State for Local Government. He was elected to Parliament in 1996.

Between 1998 and 2001, he served as the political head of the Uganda Military Expedition into the Democratic Republic of the Congo. In 2001, he was appointed Minister of State for Regional Cooperation, a position he served in until 2003. In that year he was appointed Minister of Land, Water and the Environment. He served in that capacity until 2006. Otafiire has also served as Minister for Local Government, prior to becoming Minister of Trade and Industry in February 2009. He served in that capacity until he was appointed Uganda's Justice Minister in May 2011.

Personal details
Kahinda Otafiire is married to Fridah Nayebale. He is reported to enjoy reading and teaching. He is a Major General in the Uganda People's Defence Force (UPDF).

See also
 Parliament of Uganda
 Cabinet of Uganda

References

External links

Website of the Parliament of Uganda
 Full List of Ugandan Cabinet Ministers May 2011

1950 births
Living people
People from Mitooma District
Ugandan generals
Members of the Parliament of Uganda
National Resistance Movement politicians
Makerere University alumni
People from Western Region, Uganda
Ugandan military personnel
Government ministers of Uganda
21st-century Ugandan politicians